Gregory Paul Fillmore (born March 7, 1947, in Philadelphia, Pennsylvania) is a retired professional basketball center who played two seasons in the National Basketball Association (NBA) as a member of the New York Knicks (1970–72). He attended Cheyney University of Pennsylvania where he was drafted by the Knicks during the eighth round of the 1970 NBA draft.

External links
 

1947 births
Living people
Allentown Jets players
Centers (basketball)
Cheyney Wolves men's basketball players
New York Knicks draft picks
New York Knicks players
Basketball players from Philadelphia